Tavard may refer to:
George Tavard (1922-2007), American theologian
Tavard, Iran, a village in Chaharmahal and Bakhtiari Province, Iran